U Rajesh Naik is a politician from Bantwal Karnataka. He is the Member of Legislative Assembly from Bantwal (Vidhana Sabha constituency) since May 2018 after he defeated Indian National Congress's candidate Ramanath Rai by 15,971 votes contesting the 2018 Karnataka Legislative Assembly election on a Bharatiya Janata Party ticket.

Rajesh Naik had previously lost to Ramanath Rai in 2013 Karnataka Legislative Assembly election.

Rajesh Naik is also a dairy farmer at his Oddoor farms in Thenka Yedapadavu village.

References

Karnataka MLAs 2018–2023
Bharatiya Janata Party politicians from Karnataka
1958 births
Living people